The 1992–93 UMass Minutemen basketball team represented the University of Massachusetts Amherst during the 1992–93 NCAA Division I men's basketball season. The Minutemen, led by fifth year head coach John Calipari were members of the Atlantic 10 Conference. They finished the season 24-7, 11-3 in A-10 play to finish in first place. It also marked the last season home games would be regularly played at Curry Hicks Cage.

Roster

Schedule

|-
!colspan=9| Regular season

|-
!colspan=8| 1993 Atlantic 10 men's basketball tournament

|-
!colspan=8| 1993 NCAA Division I men's basketball tournament

Rankings

References

UMass Minutemen basketball seasons
UMass
Umass